A list of notable flat horse races which take place annually in South America, as listed under review by Organización Sudamericana de Fomento del Sangre Pura de Carrera (OSAF),  including races which currently hold black type status.

In addition to the races listed below, the Gran Premio Latinoamericano is a Group One race run annually, switching among tracks in Argentina, Brazil, Chile, Panama, Peru, and Uruguay.

Argentina

Group One

Group Two

Group Three

Listed

Brazil

Group One

Group Two

Group Three

Listed

Chile

Group One

Group Two

Group Three

Listed

Peru 
All Peruvian races listed are run at Hipódromo de Monterrico.

Group One

Group Two

Group Three

Listed

Uruguay 
All Uruguayan races listed are run at Hipódromo Nacional de Maroñas, except for the listed race Gran Premio Batalla de las Piedras, run at Hipódromo Las Piedras.

Group One

Group Two

Group Three

Listed

Mexico 
All Mexican races listed are run at Hipódromo de las Américas on dirt. These races are not black type.

Panama 
All Panamanian races listed are run at Hipódromo Presidente Remón on dirt. These races are considered black type, but the given groups are not internationally recognized.

References

 South American Organization for the Promotion of the Thoroughbred (OSAF)
 Latin American Pattern Race Calendar 2021

Horse races
Horse racing-related lists
Group races